Richard Frederick Waugh (1 December 1869 – 23 June 1919) was an  Australian rules footballer who played with South Melbourne in the Victorian Football League (VFL).

Waugh was unable to play in South Melbourne's team for the Round 11 game with St Kilda in 1897 after attempting suicide. He had been spurned by his lover, and had become disconsolate. His mother found him in his room covered in blood, having cut his throat with a blunt knife. Luckily, he missed severing his windpipe and blood vessels, and a doctor was able to repair the wounds.

Notes

External links 

1869 births
1919 deaths
Australian rules footballers from Victoria (Australia)
South Melbourne Football Club (VFA) players
Sydney Swans players